Port Burwell may refer to:

 Port Burwell, Ontario, Canada
 Port Burwell, Nunavut, Canada